Brian Sherratt (29 March 1944 – 1 October 2021) was an English former footballer who played in the Football League for Barnsley, Colchester United, Nottingham Forest, Oxford United and Stoke City.

Career
Sherratt started his footballing career at his local side Stoke City's youth team. He progressed up to first team level for the 1961–62 season where he provided back-up to City's number one Jimmy O'Neill. He made just a single appearance all season where he kept a clean sheet in a 2–0 home win over Middlesbrough in April 1962. Sherratt was released at the end of the season and joined Oxford United where he played 44 times in the league before moving to Barnsley. He spent a year at the "Tykes" but failed to establish himself as number one and joined Colchester United for the 1970–71 season but left at the end of the season.

Career statistics

Honours
Oxford United
 Football League Third Division champions: 1967–68

References

1944 births
2021 deaths
English footballers
Stoke City F.C. players
Oxford United F.C. players
Nottingham Forest F.C. players
Barnsley F.C. players
Gainsborough Trinity F.C. players
Colchester United F.C. players
Oxford City F.C. players
English Football League players
Association football goalkeepers
Footballers from Stoke-on-Trent